The Lemminkäinen Suite, or more correctly Four Legends from the Kalevala, Op. 22, is a sequence of four tone poems for orchestra completed in 1895 by the Finnish composer Jean Sibelius. There is a narrative thread: the exploits are followed of the heroic character Lemminkäinen from the Kalevala, which is a collection of folkloric, mythic, epic poetry. The second tone poem, The Swan of Tuonela, is popular as a standalone orchestral work.

History
The piece was originally conceived as a mythological opera before Sibelius abandoned the idea and made it a piece consisting of four distinct movements. The first two though were withdrawn by the composer soon after its premiere and were neither performed, nor added to the published score of the suite until 1935. Sibelius changed the order of the movements when he made his final revisions in 1939, placing The Swan of Tuonela second, and Lemminkäinen in Tuonela third.

Sibelius revised the score in 1897 and 1939.

Movements
 Lemminkäinen and the Maidens of the Island is based on Canto 29 ("Conquests") of the Kalevala, where Lemminkäinen travels to an island and seduces many of the women there, before fleeing the rage of the men on the island. The movement is also known as Lemminkäinen and the Maidens of Saari, Saari being the Finnish word for island.
 The Swan of Tuonela is the most popular of the four tone poems and often is featured alone from the suite in orchestral programs.  It has a prominent cor anglais solo. The music paints a gossamer, transcendental image of a mystical swan swimming around Tuonela, the island of the dead. Lemminkäinen has been tasked with killing the sacred swan, but on the way he is shot with a poisoned arrow, and dies himself.
 Lemminkäinen in Tuonela is based on Canto 14 ("Elk, horse, swan") and 15 ("Resurrection"). Lemminkäinen is in Tuonela, the land of the dead, to shoot the Swan of Tuonela to be able to claim the daughter of Louhi, mistress of the Pohjola or Northland, in marriage.  However, the blind man of the Northland kills Lemminkäinen, whose body is then tossed in the river and then dismembered.  Lemminkäinen's mother learns of his death, travels to Tuonela, recovers his body parts, reassembles him and restores him to life.
 Lemminkäinen's Return: The storyline in the score roughly parallels the end of Canto 30 ("Pakkanen"), where after his adventures in battle, Lemminkäinen journeys home.

Instrumentation
The suite is scored for two flutes (both doubling piccolo), two oboes (one doubling cor anglais), two clarinets in B (one doubling on bass clarinet), two bassoons, four horns (in E and F), three trumpets (in E and F), three trombones, tuba, timpani, triangle, bass drum, cymbals, tambourine, glockenspiel, harp, and strings.

Recordings
The original versions of Lemminkäinen and the Maidens of the Island and Lemminkäinen's Return have been recorded by Osmo Vänskä and the Lahti Symphony Orchestra (BIS CD-1015). Other recordings of the full published suite are by the Helsinki Philharmonic Orchestra under Leif Segerstam, the Helsinki Radio Symphony Orchestra under Okko Kamu, the Gothenburg Symphony Orchestra under Neeme Järvi, The Philadelphia Orchestra under Eugene Ormandy, the Los Angeles Philharmonic Orchestra under Esa-Pekka Salonen, the London Symphony Orchestra under Sir Colin Davis, and the Iceland Symphony Orchestra under Petri Sakari.

References

Sources

External links 
 

Suites by Jean Sibelius
Symphonies by Jean Sibelius
Symphonic poems by Jean Sibelius
Music based on the Kalevala